was a ministry in the Japanese government that existed from July 1, 1960, to January 5, 2001, and is now part of the Ministry of Internal Affairs and Communications. The head of the ministry was a member of the Cabinet of Japan.

References

External links
 
 
  

Home Affairs
Politics of Post-war Japan
Japan
1960 establishments in Japan